Christchurch railway station serves the town of Christchurch in Dorset (formerly in Hampshire), England. The station is on the London Waterloo to  line operated by South Western Railway. It is  down the line from Waterloo.

History
Between 1862 and 1886, Christchurch station was sited elsewhere to the east of Fairmile Road in Christchurch - see Christchurch (RC&BR) railway station. Until 1935 the current station also serviced the line from  - see Ringwood, Christchurch and Bournemouth Railway.
The line was electrified in 1967 when faster more frequent services were introduced.

Services

This gives a journey time of about two hours from London. As well as Christchurch, the station is useful for reaching eastern parts of Bournemouth. The majority of services were previously operated by class 442 Wessex Electrics which were withdrawn in February 2007.

The station is able to accommodate trains of up to eight coaches, longer trains only open the doors in the first five or eight coaches depending on the type of unit operating the service.

Road access to the station is from the northern end of Stour Road, near to the junction with Bargates coming from the town centre, at the end of Fairmile coming from the direction of Bournemouth International Airport and the Wessex Way.  (A fairly steep bridge over the railway marks the point where Fairmile and Bargates, one straight road, meet.)

All passenger trains serving this station are operated by South Western Railway.

As of February 2022, the following services call here in both directions:
 Monday - Friday
 1 train per hour on Weymouth - London Waterloo semi-fast service
 1 train per hour on Bournemouth - Winchester stopping service
 these services are join / split at Southampton Central from the fast Weymouth service giving 2 trains per hour for London in peak hours
 Saturday
 1 train per hour on Weymouth - London Waterloo semi-fast service
 1 train per hour on Poole - Winchester stopping service
 Sunday
 1 train per hour on Poole - London Waterloo stopping service

References

Railway stations in Christchurch, Dorset
DfT Category D stations
Railway stations in Great Britain opened in 1886
Former London and South Western Railway stations
Railway stations served by South Western Railway
1886 establishments in England